1960 in professional wrestling describes the year's events in the world of professional wrestling.

List of notable promotions 
Only one promotion held notable shows in 1960.

Calendar of notable shows

Notable events
Wally Karbo and Verne Gagne's Minneapolis Boxing and Wrestling Club break away from the National Wrestling Alliance (NWA) to form the American Wrestling Association (AWA) and created the AWA World Heavyweight Championship.

Accomplishments and tournaments

EMLL

Championship changes

EMLL

NWA

Debuts
Debut date uncertain:
Alfonso Dantés
George Steele
Gorilla Monsoon
Harley Race
Karl Von Steiger
Pat Barrett
El Solitario
Uncle Elmer
September 30:
Antonio Inoki
Giant Baba
November 12  Rocket Monroe
December 28  Angelo Mosca

Births
January 1  Rayo de Jalisco Jr.
January 3  Ross Hart
January 10  Negro Casas
January 23  Leilani Kai
February 3:
Kerry Von Erich(died in 1993) 
Marty Jannetty
February 12  One Man Gang
February 17  Shunji Kosugi
March 2  Debra Marshall 
March 3  Ben Bassarab
March 16  Kenny Bolin
March 19  Moondog Cujo(died in 2009)
March 22:
Jimbo Covert
Villano V 
April 12  Tony Anthony / Dirty White Boy
April 16  Damian Kane 
April 18  Vic Steamboat
April 24  Lance Von Erich
April 29  Paul Roma
May 11  Kodo Fuyuki(died in 2003) 
May 14  "Dr. Death" Steve Williams(died in 2009) 
May 20  Dale Veasey 
May 23  Pat Rose
May 27  Kelly Kiniski
June 1  Brian Adias
June 2  Timothy Flowers
June 10  Cueball Carmichael
June 13  Jacques Rougeau
June 23  Súper Ratón
July 4  Barry Windham
July 9  Johnny B. Badd
July 23  Al Perez
July 27  Fidel Sierra
July 31  Mark Fleming 
August 4  Dean Malenko
August 6  Jose Luis Rivera 
August 10  Brett Sawyer
August 11  Brickhouse Brown (died in 2018) 
September 2  Todd Champion
September 11  Road Warrior Animal(died in 2020) 
September 18  Blue Panther
September 23  Kurt Beyer
September 26  David Sammartino
October 1  Tim Burke(died in 2011) 
October 4  Bobby Fulton 
October 10  Soldat Ustinov 
October 23  Bubba Monroe (died in 2022) 
October 30  Roadblock 
November 11  Dump Matsumoto
November 16  John Condrone (died in 2020)
December 18  Moondog Splat
November 19  Miss Elizabeth(died in 2003)
December 9  Steve Doll(died 2009) 
December 16  Sid Vicious 
December 27  Franz Schumann
December 29  Mark Madden

Deaths
January 7  Jack Claybourne, 49
May 22  Great Gama 82
June 16  Médico Asesino 39
July 17  Paul Bowser 74
December 11  Tor Yamato 43

References

 
professional wrestling